Wagram was a late 100-gun Hercule-class ship of the line of the French Navy, transformed into a Sail and Steam ship.

Service history
Started as Bucentaure, Wagram took part in the Crimean War and in the Battle of Kinburn. In 1862, she served in the French intervention in Mexico.

On 29 April 1867, she was sunk as a target for torpedo trials.

Citations and references

Citations

References

 100-guns ships of the line

Ships of the line of the French Navy
1854 ships
Hercule-class ships of the line
Victorian-era ships of the line